Henry Edmund Symes-Thompson (22 June 1873 – 18 January 1952) was an English first-class cricketer and physician.

The son of Edmund Symes-Thompson, he was born at Marylebone in June 1873. He was educated at Winchester College, before going up to Christ's College, Cambridge. While studying at Cambridge University, he played first-class cricket for Cambridge University Cricket Club on four occasions in 1894 and 1895, though did not gain a blue. Besides playing first-class cricket for Cambridge University, Symes-Thompson also played for the Marylebone Cricket Club on four occasions between 1896 and 1906. He scored a total of 174 runs in eight first-class appearances, averaging 11.60 with a highest score of 31. 

After gaining his medical degree from Cambridge, Symes-Thompson trained at St George's Hospital in London. He was a house surgeon and physician at Westminster Hospital and later a physician at the Royal Northern Hospital and the Royal Brompton Hospital. His final medical post was as a physician at St George's Hospital. His son, Richard, followed in his fathers footsteps and also became a physician. He was killed during the last major bombing raid on London in May 1941. Symes-Thompson died at Oxford in January 1952. His brother, Francis, also played first-class cricket, as did his brother-in-law Arthur Page.

References

External links

1873 births
1952 deaths
People from Marylebone
People educated at Winchester College
Alumni of Christ's College, Cambridge
English cricketers
Cambridge University cricketers
Marylebone Cricket Club cricketers
19th-century English medical doctors
20th-century English medical doctors